Siwai may refer to:
 Siwai Rural LLG, in South Bougainville District, Papua New Guinea
 Siwai language, spoken in Bougainville, Papua New Guinea
 Sewar, a type of dagger

See also 
 Sewai, a town in Jharkhand, India